Jane Ann Cooper Bennett (born 1960) is an Australian painter.

Biography 
Born at Manly, New South Wales, Australia in 1960, Bennett's parents divorced before her birth. She was raised by her mother and grandparents in the family home at Seaforth and attended Mackellar Girls High School at Manly Vale and Ku-ring-gai High School at North Turramurra. In 1979 she enrolled at the Alexander Mackie College of Advanced Education attaining a Diploma of Fine Arts in 1982 and a Graduate Diploma in Art Studies the subsequent year.

Amongst the many accolades she has received, Bennett achieved recognition as a finalist in the 1986, 1997 and 2008 Sir John Sulman Prize, 5 times a finalist in the Dobell Prize  and 6 times a finalist in the Wynne Prize, winning the 1990, 1995 and 1996 Pring Prize for Watercolour and the 1995 Trustees’ Prize for Watercolour. In total she has won over 120 art prizes in a career spanning more than 30 years.

Art 
Bennett is a plein air painter with a passion for recording the process of urban renewal. She is renowned for her paintings of abandoned industrial and maritime sites in and around Sydney. Subjects of her art include: Balmain, Pyrmont and White Bay Power Stations, CSR Refinery, AGL Gasworks, Carlton United Brewery, Eveleigh Railway Workshops, Cockatoo Island and wharves at White Bay, Glebe Island, Pyrmont, Barangaroo, Walsh Bay and Woolloomooloo.

Her work is represented in many collections including:
 State Library of New South Wales
 Artbank
 National Trust of Australia
 University of New South Wales
 University of Sydney
 Department of Defence (Australia)

Gallery

See also

References

Further reading 

Marshall, Stephen (2014), "Jane Bennett", Design and Art Australia Online,  Jane Bennett :: biography at :: at Design and Art Australia Online
Bennett, Jane, "Industrial Revelation", Blogger, http://janebennettartist.blogspot.com.au/
Frances Keevil Gallery, Sydney, http://www.franceskeevilgallery.com.au/artists_essay.php?artistID=1-Jane%20Bennett
Germaine, Max (1990), Artists & Galleries of Australia (Third Edition), Sydney: Craftsman House.
Germaine, Max, (1991), A Dictionary of Women Artists of Australia, Sydney: Craftsman House.
McCulloch, Susan (1994), The Encyclopedia of Australian Art (Third edition), Sydney: Allen & Unwin.

Australian watercolourists
Australian women painters
Australian landscape painters
1960 births
Living people
People from Manly, New South Wales
Women watercolorists
21st-century Australian women artists
21st-century Australian artists